Rebecca Stott (born 1964) is a British writer and broadcaster and, until her retirement from teaching in 2021, was Professor of Literature and Creative Writing at the University of East Anglia. She was elected a Fellow of the Royal Society of Literature in 2021.

She is the author of two historical novels, of a biography of Charles Darwin and of a 2,200-year history of Darwin's predecessors. Her most recent book In the Days of Rain (2017), a memoir giving an account of her childhood growing up in the Exclusive Brethren, won the 2017 Costa Book Award in the Biography category.

She is a regular broadcaster on the BBC Radio 4 programme A Point of View. She has three adult children.

Early life
Stott was born in Cambridge in 1964, the fourth generation of her family to be born into the Exclusive Brethren, a strictly separatist branch of the Plymouth Brethren with about 45,000 members worldwide. The Brethren, who have since renamed themselves the Plymouth Brethren Christian Church, seek to live separately from the rest of the world because they believe that it is ruled by Satan. During the 1960s, when Stott was growing up, the cult forbade its members to make use of newspapers, television, cinema, radio, universities, wristwatches and cameras. It required women to be entirely subject to their husbands and controlled every aspect of members' lives.

Stott's family left the sect in the 1970s after a sexual scandal involving the world leader, the Man of God, split the movement and when her family broke away to join a new splinter group. They left the Brethren altogether in 1972.

Education and career
Stott won a scholarship to Brighton and Hove High School in 1976. She then studied English and Art History at the University of York, then studied for a Master of Arts and a PhD also at York. She taught at the University of York, the University of Leeds, then Anglia Ruskin University at Cambridge before being appointed to a chair at the University of East Anglia in Norwich. She is an affiliated scholar at the Department of the History and Philosophy of Science at the University of Cambridge.

Fiction
Stott's debut novel, Ghostwalk (2007) was shortlisted for the Jelf Group First Novel Award and the Authors' Club Best First Novel Award. Lydia Brooke is called upon to be the ghostwriter of a book on Sir Isaac Newton's alchemy. Brooke comes to suspect that the death of the book's author, Cambridge historian Elizabeth Vogelsang, may somehow relate to a series of unsolved seventeenth-century murders. The novel, an innovative mix of fiction and non-fiction, blends seventeenth-century accounts of plague, glassmaking, alchemy and theories of optics with a contemporary plot involving quantum physics and animal rights campaigns. The New York Times reviewer called it "Mesmerizing . . . Ghostwalk has an all-too-rare scholarly authority and imaginative sparkle" and compared it to the works of Borges and Edgar Allan Poe. The Independent in 2012 chose it as one of ten best ghost novels.

Stott's second novel, The Coral Thief, set in 1815 post-Napoleonic France, is a thriller that explores religion, rationalism, and evolutionary theory while its hero, a medical student, becomes drawn into a daring jewel heist. It was serialised on Radio Four's Book at Bedtime in January 2010. Kate Williams in the Financial Times described it as "an intellectual thriller, a book of penetrating humanity and a vivid evocation of Paris in the wake of Bonaparte's defeat".

Stott's third novel, Dark Earth, was published in the US and the UK in June 2022. It is set in the sixth century in the ruined Roman city of Londinium. When sisters, Isla and Blue, on the run from local warlords, seek refuge in the abandoned city and find there a community of women refugees, they have to fight for their survival when the warlords track them down. The Observer, called it: 'radically new and beautiful, a book that retells a period of our national past that straddles the line between history and myth.'

Creative non-fiction
Before 2003 Stott published academic books including books on Tennyson, Elizabeth Barrett Browning (with Simon Avery) and other aspects of Victorian culture. Since 2003 she has published books of creative non-fiction which explore the boundaries between literature, intellectual history and the history of science. Darwin and the Barnacle (Faber, 2003) tells the story of Darwin's obsession with breaking the riddle of a single aberrant barnacle species he had found in a conch shell on a beach in Southern Chile and which led him to complete an enormous work of barnacle taxonomy while his revolutionary work on natural selection lay locked away in a drawer.

In 2012 she published a book about the history of evolution before Darwin. Darwin's Ghosts: In Search of the First Evolutionists was published in the UK by Bloomsbury Publishing and in the US by Spiegel and Grau in May 2012.

Memoir
In June 2017, Stott published In the Days of Rain, a family memoir about growing up in the Exclusive Brethren, a secretive and separatist Christian fundamentalist cult. It won the 2017 Costa Book Awards in the Biography category. Francis Spufford, author of Golden Hill, described it as "A marvellous, strange, terrifying book", and Mark Mills, author of The Savage Garden, as "Truly magnificent: a big, beautiful, brutal, and tender masterpiece. A deeply affecting human story that also goes to the dark heart of who we are and how the world works". The Times reviewer described it as "compassionate and furious' and 'an intense accomplishment".

Since the book was published Stott has received over 300 letters from ex-members of the Brethren describing their own family stories of suicide, mental breakdown and broken families.The letters are being assembled into an online archive.

Selected works
 The Fabrication of the Late Victorian Femme Fatale, 1992
 Tennyson, 1996
 Elizabeth Barrett Browning (with Simon Avery), 2003
 Oyster, 2003
 Theatres of Glass: The Woman Who Brought the Sea to the City, 2003
 Darwin and the Barnacle, 2003
 Ghostwalk, 2007
 The Coral Thief, 2009
 Darwin's Ghosts: In Search of the First Evolutionists, 2012
 In The Days of Rain, 2017
 Dark Earth, 2022

References

External links
 Personal website

1964 births
People from Cambridge
British women writers
Charles Darwin biographers
Alumni of the University of York
Academics of the University of East Anglia
Living people